The 2014–15 Bundesliga was the 52nd season of the Bundesliga, Germany's premier football competition. The season started on 22 August 2014 and the final matchday took place on 23 May 2015. Bayern Munich won their 25th German title on 26 April 2015.

Background
Bayern Munich came into the season as defending champions, winning the championship on 25 March 2014 against Hertha BSC. Armin Veh announced that he was leaving Eintracht Frankfurt during the 2013–14 season. He had demanded that the club invest more money in the squad. Thomas Schaaf replaced Veh.

Bayer Leverkusen sacked Sami Hyypiä during the 2013–14 season. Sascha Lewandowski was named interim manager. Lewandowski's interim reign lasted until the end of the season when Roger Schmidt took over. Other managerial changes include Kasper Hjulmand replacing Thomas Tuchel at 1. FSV Mainz 05 and Armin Veh replacing Huub Stevens at VfB Stuttgart. Every club received their licence. The league schedule came out on 24 June with Bayern Munich facing VfL Wolfsburg in the opening fixture on 22 August. The match ended 2–1 win for Bayern Munich, a record third straight win for the home team, on the opening matchday, in the last three seasons.

Teams

18 teams comprise the league. 15 sides qualified directly from the 2013–14 season and two sides were directly promoted from the 2013–14 2. Fußball-Bundesliga season: 1. FC Köln and SC Paderborn 07. The final participant was decided by a two-legged play-off, in which 16th-placed Bundesliga club Hamburger SV defeated third-place finisher in 2. Bundesliga, SpVgg Greuther Fürth.

Stadiums and locations

Personnel and kits

Managerial changes

Notes
 Announced on 3 March 2014.
 Announced on 25 April 2014.
 Announced on 10 May 2014.
 Announced on 12 May 2014.

League table

Results

Relegation play-offs
The team which finishes 16th, will face the third-placed 2014–15 2. Bundesliga side for a two-legged play-off. The winner on aggregate score after both matches earns entry into the 2015–16 Bundesliga. Hamburger SV prevailed for the second year in a row, avoiding their possible first relegation.

First leg

Second leg

Hamburger SV won 3–2 on aggregate.

Season statistics

Top goalscorers

Hat-tricks

4 Player scored four goals

Number of teams by state

Notes

References

External links

 

Bundesliga seasons
1
Germany